The 1910–11 RPI men's ice hockey season was the 8th season of play for the program.

Season
The team had a dreadful season, losing all their games and being soundly beaten in most.

Note: Rensselaer's athletic teams were unofficially known as 'Cherry and White' until 1921 when the Engineers moniker debuted for the men's basketball team.

Roster

Standings

Schedule and Results

|-
!colspan=12 style=";" | Regular Season

References

RPI Engineers men's ice hockey seasons
RPI
RPI
RPI
RPI